Kumpinipuram is a small village in the Nandalur mandalam, Rajampet taluka of Kadapa district, in the Rayalaseema region of Andhra Pradesh, India. 
There are two temples in the village, these are: Sri Bhoga Anjaneya Swamy Temple, and Sri Sri Sri Ragvendra Swami Matta Gosala.

References 

 https://www.tenderdetail.com/Indian-Tenders/TenderNotice/19623131/8C253F51D29ACBECF101D59E96B1717A - Augmentation of SVS at Kumpinipuram village
 https://www.postoffices.co.in/andhrapradesh-ap/kumpinipuram-nandalur-51-cuddapah/ - Post Office Information Directory
 http://www.elections.in/andhra-pradesh/polling-stations/rajampet.html - Polling Booth in Rajampet Assembly Constituency
 https://aprationcard.com/rajampet-kadapa-blos/ - (BLOs) – Details

Villages in Kadapa district